Viktoriya Titova (born 29 July 1971) is a Ukrainian former fencer. She competed in the women's épée event at the 1996 Summer Olympics.

References

External links
 

1971 births
Living people
Ukrainian female épée fencers
Olympic fencers of Ukraine
Fencers at the 1996 Summer Olympics
Universiade medalists in fencing
Universiade bronze medalists for Ukraine
Medalists at the 1997 Summer Universiade
20th-century Ukrainian women
21st-century Ukrainian women